The Italy national under-19 football team is the national under-19 football team of Italy and is controlled by the Italian Football Federation.

The team competes in the UEFA European Under-19 Championship, held every year.

UEFA U-18 Championship Record 
Before 2002, the event was called a U-18 tournament, as the players were required to under-18 at the start of qualifying phase and turn 19 in the final round.
 1981: Second Round
 1982: Qualifying Round
 1983: Semi-finalists
 1984: Second Round
 1986: Runners-up
 1988: Qualifying Round
 1990: Qualifying Round
 1992: Qualifying Round
 1993: Intermediary Round
 1994: Intermediary Round
 1995: Runners-up
 1996: 4th in Group B
 1997: Preliminary Round
 1998: Preliminary Round
 1999: Runners-up
 2000: Intermediary Round
 2001: Preliminary Round

UEFA U-19 Championship Record

Honours
 UEFA European Under-19 Championship
 Winner: 2003
 Runners-up: 2008; 2016; 2018
 Under-18 era (1957–2001)
 Winner: 1958; 1966
 Runners-up: 1959; 1986; 1995; 1999

Coaches
 1992–2006: Paolo Berrettini 
 2006–2008: Francesco Rocca
 2008–2010: Massimo Piscedda
 2010–2011: Daniele Zoratto
 2011–2013: Alberigo Evani
 2013–2015: Alessandro Pane
 2015–2016: Paolo Vanoli
 2016–2017: Roberto Baronio
 2017–2018: Paolo Nicolato
 2018–2019: Federico Guidi
 2019: Carmine Nunziata
 2019–2020: Alberto Bollini
 2020–present: Carmine Nunziata

Current squad
The following 20 players were called up for the Elite round of the 2023 UEFA European Under-19 Championship.

See also 
 Italy national under-20 football team
 UEFA European Under-19 Championship

External links 
 UEFA Under-19 website Contains full results archive
 The Rec.Sport.Soccer Statistics Foundation Contains full record of U-18/U-19 Championships.

References 

Under-19
European national under-19 association football teams
Youth football in Italy